The Glessner Bridge is a historic covered bridge in Stonycreek Township, Somerset County, Pennsylvania. The bridge crosses Stonycreek River. It is one of 10 covered bridges in Somerset County.

It was added to the National Register of Historic Places in 1980.

References

Covered bridges in Somerset County, Pennsylvania
Covered bridges on the National Register of Historic Places in Pennsylvania
Bridges completed in 1881
Bridges in Somerset County, Pennsylvania
National Register of Historic Places in Somerset County, Pennsylvania
Road bridges on the National Register of Historic Places in Pennsylvania
Wooden bridges in Pennsylvania
King post truss bridges in the United States